Bankstown is an electoral district of the Legislative Assembly in the Australian state of New South Wales in Sydney's West. It has historically been one of the safest  seats in New South Wales. Until 1 March 2023, the seat was represented by Tania Mihailuk, a former member of the Labor party turned One Nation member.

Bankstown includes the suburbs of Bankstown, Bass Hill, Birrong, Chester Hill, Condell Park, Georges Hall, Lansdowne, Potts Hill, Punchbowl, Regents Park, Revesby, Sefton, Villawood, Yagoona.

Members for Bankstown

Election results

References

Electoral districts of New South Wales
1927 establishments in Australia
Constituencies established in 1927
City of Canterbury-Bankstown